WR 119 is a Wolf–Rayet star located about 10,500 light years away in the constellation Scutum. WR 119 is classified as a WC9 star, belonging to the late-type carbon sequence of Wolf-Rayet stars. The most recent estimate is even lower, at just , based on the most recent analysis using Gaia DR2 data.

Properties 
WR 119's properties are on the very edge of what may be possible for Wolf-Rayet stars, due to being so extremely dim. The corresponding radius is only , the smallest of the WC9 stars, less than half the size of the average WC9 star. WR 119's luminosity is also just 20% that of the average WC9 star's luminosity. The corresponding mass is just , the lowest mass for any Wolf-Rayet star derived using a mass-luminosity relation. 

WR 119 has a strong stellar wind, typical of Wolf-Rayet stars, but weaker than most WC stars. WR 119 loses 10-5.13 M☉ (about ) per year because of this stellar wind, which has a terminal velocity of 1,300 kilometres per second. WR 119 also emits a lot of dust, hence the "d" at the end of its spectral type, which may be an indication of binary status.

References 

Wolf–Rayet stars
Scutum (constellation)